Qays Shayesteh (born 22 March 1988) is an Afghan former professional footballer who plays as a midfielder for GVV Eilermark. He has also played for Twente (youth club), Heracles Almelo, Veendam, Emmen, VV Glanerbrug and DETO.

International career
Shayesteh is a former youth international for the Netherlands. He represented the Afghanistan national team from 2011 until 2017, making five appearances.

References

External links

 
 Qays Shayesteh at Voetbal International

1988 births
Living people
Footballers from Kabul
Afghan footballers
Dutch footballers
Association football midfielders
Afghan refugees
Afghanistan international footballers
Netherlands youth international footballers
Afghan emigrants to the Netherlands
Eredivisie players
Eerste Divisie players
Heracles Almelo players
FC Twente players
SC Veendam players
FC Emmen players
DETO Twenterand players
Afghan expatriate sportspeople in the Netherlands